The Mint in Southwark Act 1722 is an Act of the Parliament of Great Britain (statute number 9 Geo. 1 c. 28). It was passed to remove certain legal privileges of The Mint, a location in Southwark which had become the haunt of debtors, and to allow the Sheriff of Surrey to enter and remove them.

It was repealed by sections 1 and 2 of the Capital Punishment Act 1820 (c.116) and by the Statute Law Revision Act 1867.

See also
Escape of Debtors, etc. Act 1696
The Marshalsea debtors' prison

References
'Book 1, Ch. 19: George I', A New History of London: Including Westminster and Southwark (1773), pp. 306–25. URL: http://www.british-history.ac.uk/report.asp?compid=46736. Date accessed: 20 November 2006.
 The text of the act

1722 in England
Repealed Great Britain Acts of Parliament
Great Britain Acts of Parliament 1722